Rolvenden railway station is a heritage railway station on the Kent and East Sussex Railway in Tenterden, Kent, in the United Kingdom.

Early history 
The station was originally opened as Tenterden but was renamed Rolvenden in 1903when the current Tenterden Town station opened. The name Rolvenden is not really appropriate, the station is 2 miles from the village and is closer to Tenterden. When Colonel Stephens first opened the railway Rolvenden served as his locomotive workshop in a similar capacity to today. However the limited machinery and space meant during the 1930s it became harder to overhaul the line's ageing fleet. Most engines were sent to Ashford works to be overhauled. The locomotive shed and passenger station closed in 1954 and both were subsequently demolished. Freight services continued until 1961.
After British Railways closed the railway the site of the original locomotive shed was sold for light industrial buildings.

Heritage Railway Society history 
The Kent and East Sussex Railway built a new locomotive shed on the other side of the line from the original. Currently the station is home to the Kent and East Sussex Railway's loco department who are responsible for the restoration and maintenance of steam engines owned by the railway.  The loco department is one of the most crucial contributors to the railway's success.  The site consists of a two track shed which has enough space for around 4 locomotives.  The railway also owns the field next to it and has plans to use at least part of it as a car park.  Rolvenden is also the coaling depot and this is where all the locomotives are prepared for a day's work. It now has a signal box, water tower and passing loop. The station was rebuilt when the line reopened in 1974.

Services

Locomotives in residence 

 Number 3   LB&SCR A1 Class 0-6-0T (Terrier) 'Bodiam'.  In service.
 Number 8   LB&SCR A1 Class 0-6-0T (Terrier) 'Knowle'.  In service
 Number 11  SECR P Class 0-6-0T. Undergoing major overhaul
 Number 12  (Small 0-4-0T) 'Marcia'. Undergoing overhaul
 Number 14  (Industrial 0-6-0T) 'Charwelton'. In service
 Number 19  Norwegian 2-6-0 . In Service.
 Number 21  SR USA Class DS238  0-6-0T 'Wainwright'.  In Service 
 Number 22  SR USA Class  0-6-0T 'Maunsell'. Undergoing Overhaul 
 Number 23  Standard War Department 0-6-0ST  'Holman F Stephens'. Awaiting major overhaul.
 Number 24  Standard War Department 0-6-0ST 'Rolvenden'. Sold, no longer at the railway
 Number 25  Standard War Department 0-6-0ST 'Northiam'.  In Service 
 Number 30  GWR 1600 Class 0-6-0PT no. 1638. In service
 Number 1   No. 1 Thomas the Tank Engine. In service. The railway loans a loco for its annual Thomas & Friends events
 Number N/A Merioneth and Llantisilly Rail Traction Company Limited Ivor the Engine 0-4-0T. Loaned for the yearly Ivor the Engine Weekends. Has the strange award of being the last engine to be overhauled at Swindon Works, before closure.

References

Heritage railway stations in Kent
Former Kent and East Sussex Railway stations
Railway stations in Great Britain opened in 1900
Railway stations in Great Britain closed in 1954
Railway stations in Great Britain opened in 1974